Werribee South is a locality in Victoria, Australia,  southwest of Melbourne's Central Business District, located within the City of Wyndham local government area.

Werribee South is a rural-urban suburb located just outside of the Melbourne metropolitan area.

History

The Post Office opened on 15 May 1916 as Duncans Road, was renamed Werribee South in 1926 and closed in 1973.

Today

Werribee South is located 32 km southwest of Melbourne and covers an area of 3,000 hectares. Werribee South has around 150 vegetable farms producing lettuce, broccoli, cauliflower, fennel, and artichoke. Around 70% of Australia's lettuces are sourced from Werribee South and since January 2007 Werribee South's farms have been part of the Werribee Irrigation District Recycled Water Scheme.

Werribee South borders Point Cook and contains Werribee Park. Werribee South's streets originally were named by letters. This was changed by the Wyndham City Council, and the only remaining lettered street is K Road. Along K Road, The Werribee Mansion, Werribee Open Range Zoo and the National Equestrian Centre can be found.

A sports oval (primarily used for Australian rules football), playgrounds, community services, and food facilities can be found along the beach of Werribee South, at the main population hub of the area. The area is popular with recreational fishers, and developments include a boat launch and a marina.

Werribee South is also home to the Diggers Road Memorial Hall, which is the rehearsal venue for the Werribee Concert Band. The Diggers Road Memorial Hall was built to commemorate Australia's participation in the First World War and is located at the corner of Diggers Road and Whites Road.

References

Suburbs of Melbourne
Werribee, Victoria
Suburbs of the City of Wyndham